The Window Over the Way is a 1993 Spanish drama film directed by Jesús Garay. It was entered into the 44th Berlin International Film Festival.

Cast
 Juanjo Puigcorbé as Adil Bey
 Estelle Skornik as Sonia
 Ben Gazzara as John
 Carme Elias

References

External links

1993 films
1990s Spanish-language films
1993 drama films
Films directed by Jesús Garay
Spanish drama films
1990s Spanish films